Job 19 is the nineteenth chapter of the Book of Job in the Hebrew Bible or the Old Testament of the Christian Bible. The book is anonymous; most scholars believe it was written around 6th century BCE. This chapter records the speech of Job, which belongs to the Dialogue section of the book, comprising Job 3:1–31:40.

Text
The original text is written in Hebrew language. This chapter is divided into 29 verses.

Textual witnesses
Some early manuscripts containing the text of this chapter in Hebrew are of the Masoretic Text, which includes the Aleppo Codex (10th century), and Codex Leningradensis (1008).

There is also a translation into Koine Greek known as the Septuagint, made in the last few centuries BC; some extant ancient manuscripts of this version include Codex Vaticanus (B; B; 4th century), Codex Sinaiticus (S; BHK: S; 4th century), and Codex Alexandrinus (A; A; 5th century).

Analysis
The structure of the book is as follows:
The Prologue (chapters 1–2)
The Dialogue (chapters 3–31)
The Verdicts (32:1–42:6)
The Epilogue (42:7–17)

Within the structure, chapter 19 is grouped into the Dialogue section with the following outline:
Job's Self-Curse and Self-Lament (3:1–26)
Round One (4:1–14:22)
Round Two (15:1–21:34)
Eliphaz (15:1–35)
Job (16:1–17:16)
Bildad (18:1–21)
Job (19:1–29)
Rebuking the Friends (19:1–6)
God's Treatment of Him (19:7–12)
Others Have Abandoned Him (19:13–20)
Plea to the Friends to Stop (19:21–22)
The Possibility of a Redeemer (19:23–27)
Back to the Friends (19:28–29)
Zophar (20:1–29)
Job (21:1–34)
Round Three (22:1–27:23)
Interlude – A Poem on Wisdom (28:1–28)
Job's Summing Up (29:1–31:40)

The Dialogue section is composed in the format of poetry with distinctive syntax and grammar. 

Chapter 19 is largely a lament that can be divided into several parts:
Job's lament to God and the people (verses 1–22)
Job complains his friends' torments of him (verses 1–6)
Job laments God's treatment to him (verses 7–12)
Job laments people's abandonment of him (verses 13–20)
Job pleads his friends to stop rebuking him (verses 21–22)
Job explores the possibility of a redeemer (verses 23–27)
Job warns his friends of the judgment for mistreating him (verses 28–29)

Job's lament to God and the people (19:1–22)
Job's lament in this section is framed by his complaint of his friends tormenting him (verses 1–6) and his plea for his friends to stop doing that action (verses 21–22). In between, Job laments that he no doubt believes God's ultimate power over his fate, but he simply cannot understand why God took away his dignity and reputation ("glory" and "crown", verse 9), also that his family and the people have deserted him ("his brothers", verse 13; "all who knew him", verses 13b, 14b), "closest friends" (verse 19), basically the entire community (cf. Job 30).

Verse 4
[Job said:] "And if indeed I have erred,
my error remains with me."
"I have erred": translated from the Hebrew verb , shagiti, is in the form of a hypothetical clause, because Job maintains his innocence.
Job insists that even if it were true he has committed a minor, inadvertent sin (cf. Leviticus 5:18; Numbers 15:8), definitely not the intentional sin being accused by his friends, then it is solely Job concern, a matter between Job and God alone, not for his friends to prosecute him. 

The Greek Septuagint version has an insertion between the two lines: "in having spoken words which it is not right to speak, and my words err, and are unreasonable".

Job's lament to God and the people (19:23–27)
This section is seen as the high point of Job's faith and hope, showing his belief with confidence in a "living redeemer" (verse 25a). The identity of this redeemer could be a hypothetical legal figure, like the "umpire/arbiter" (Job 9:33) or "witness" (Job 16:19). Job's biggest desire is not justice or vindication, but the restoration of his relationship with God. At the end, Job warns his friends ("you" in verse 28a is plural) to be afraid of judgment to them for their wrongful treatment of Job.

Verse 25
[Job said:] "For I know that my Redeemer lives,
and He will stand at last on the earth;"
"My Redeemer": or "my Vindicator", from the active participle of the Hebrew word , gaʾal' ("to redeem, protect, vindicate"), a well-known word in the Hebrew Bible because of its identification as the "kinsman-redeemer" (cf. Book of Ruth), who is 'the near kinsman who will pay off one’s debts, defend the family, avenge a killing, marry the widow of the deceased'. The concept might include the description of the mediator in Job 16:19.
"At last": translated from the Hebrew word  , ʾakharon'' ("last") in an adjectival form, not adverbial, as an epithet of the vindicator.

See also

Related Bible parts: Job 17, Job 42

References

Sources

External links
 Jewish translations:
 Iyov - Job - Chapter 19 (Judaica Press) translation [with Rashi's commentary] at Chabad.org
 Christian translations:
 Online Bible at GospelHall.org (ESV, KJV, Darby, American Standard Version, Bible in Basic English)
 Book of Job Chapter 19. Various versions
  Various versions

19